Infant moth may refer to:

 Infant (Archiearis infans), a moth of the family Geometridae
 Scarce infant moth (Leucobrephos brephoides), a moth of the family Geometridae